Ray Suen (born July 5, 1985) is an American musician based in Los Angeles, California, best known for his work with Childish Gambino, Lorde and Mariachi El Bronx.

Career
Raised in San Diego, California and classically trained, Suen began playing violin at the age of three.  He served as a principal violinist with the La Jolla Symphony Orchestra and also studied jazz while earning a degree in Psychology at UCSD.  He became a fixture in the San Diego music scene performing with rock, folk, jazz, and world music groups as well as recording with such artists as Jason Mraz, Matt Curreri & the Exfriends, Joanie Mendenhall, and  Gregory Page among others.  He would also occasionally feature with the Joe Firstman house band on Last Call with Carson Daly.

Upon graduation in 2007, he began his first national tour playing violin and keys with San Diego glam-rock band, Louis XIV opening for the Las Vegas rock band, The Killers on the last leg of their Sam's Town Tour.  Suen would later join The Killers in 2008 as keyboardist, guitarist, violinist, and backing vocalist for their Day & Age World Tour and appears on The Killers' live concert DVD, Live from the Royal Albert Hall.

Suen met members of Mariachi El Bronx when they opened for the Killers and began touring with them following the end of the Day & Age Tour.   He would later become a member, writing songs and playing  vihuela, jarana, harp, guitar, violin, and vocals for albums "II" and "III".  Suen left the band in 2014.

Other artists Suen has performed with include Devon Sproule, The Flaming Lips and Childish Gambino. Suen played with Sproule during a short tour in February 2009  and played percussion with The Flaming Lips on The Tonight Show with Conan O'Brien in October 2009. Suen appeared again with The Flaming Lips at the 2011 New Year's Eve Freakout playing harp, guitar, synth and other percussion for the first live performance of The Soft Bulletin album. He performed subsequent Soft Bulletin shows as well as Dark Side of the Moon shows as an auxiliary musician.

Suen joined Childish Gambino during the I Am Donald tour playing guitar, keyboard, and violin. He resumed playing with Childish Gambino for the Camp, Because the Internet and This is America tours. He also contributed to the "Awaken, My Love!" album released December 2016.

In 2015, Suen was a touring member of Passion Pit in support of their third album, Kindred.  In 2016, he toured with Australian R&B artist Jarryd James playing keyboards in support of his first American album, "High."  

Suen has released 2 EPs as his solo project, Savio Savio.

In 2017, Suen began working as musical director for Lorde in support of her sophomore release, Melodrama, playing keys and guitar as well as arranging band, vocals, strings and horns.  He is currently working with Lorde in support of her Solar Power tour.

Selected discography

 Adam Melchor – Lullaby Hotline Vol. I (2021) – pedal steel guitar
Bill & Ted Face the Music (2020) – additional music 
 Trolls World Tour – Original Motion Picture Soundtrack (2020) – guitar
 Khalid – Free Spirit (Khalid album) (2019) – guitar
 Kamasi Washington – Heaven and Earth (2018) – violin
 Jaws of Love – Tasha Sits Close to the Piano (2017) – strings, engineer
 Clinical – Soundtrack (2017) – strings
 Miles Mosley – Uprising (2017) – violin
 Childish Gambino – "Awaken, My Love!" (2016) – guitar, keys, additional production.
 My Blind Brother – Soundtrack (2016) – violin, viola 
 Burning Bodhi – Soundtrack (2015) – whistling, violin, string arrangement
 Carl Barât & The Jackals – "Let It Reign" (2015) – bass, strings
 Mariachi El Bronx- "III" (2014) – violin, vihuela, guitar, vocals
 Willis Earl Beal – "Nobody Knows" (2013) – violin
 The Enemy – "Streets in the Sky" – violin
 Madness (band) – "Oui Oui Si Si Ja Ja Da Da" (2012) – violins, vocals
 Mariachi El Bronx – Mariachi El Bronx (II) (2011) – Vihuela, Jarana, vocals (background), harp, guitar, violin
 White Sea – This Frontier EP (2010) – strings, guitar
 Transfer – Future Selves (2011) – strings
 Armistice – Armistice EP (2011) – strings, guitar
The Killers – Live from the Royal Albert Hall (2009) – guitar, keyboards, violin, backing vocals credited as Ray L. Suen
Louis XIV – Slick Dogs and Ponies (2007) – strings credited as Mister Raymond Suen

References

External links and references
 Official Ray Suen site
 SAVIO SAVIO site

American violinists
American male violinists
American multi-instrumentalists
American rock guitarists
American male guitarists
Musicians from San Diego
The Killers members
Living people
1985 births
People from Newark, Delaware
University of California, San Diego alumni
Guitarists from California
21st-century violinists